Søren Engell Friis (born 13 December 1976) is a former Danish professional football midfielder.

Friis played a big part in AC Horsens' promotion to the Superliga in 2004/05, when he was a regular starter at the left wing scored the cruisial deciding goal in the second-last match of the season against BK Skjold in Copenhagen. It was in that game the promotion was secured. 

During the club's time in the Superliga Friis has been on and off the team, but has, however, participated in many important matches and scored 3 league goals.

External links
Career statistics at Danmarks Radio

1976 births
Living people
Danish men's footballers
AC Horsens players
Danish Superliga players
Brabrand IF players

Association football midfielders